Midway Studios Newcastle Limited (originally Pitbull Syndicate) was a British video game developer based in Gateshead, England.

History 
Pitbull Syndicate was formed in December 1996 by an ensemble of programmers and artists with extensive experience in the video game industry. The company started with a small office in Sunderland, England, and initially employed eight people, working on PC and PlayStation games. Slowly expanding, the company moved to larger offices in Chester-le-Street and later to larger offices in Gateshead. By 2005, its staff had swelled to over 60 people working on PC, PlayStation 2 and Xbox.

In October 2005, the company was sold to Midway Games and were renamed Midway Studios Newcastle. Prior to that, Pitbull had created the titles L.A. Rush and Rush for Midway. It was Midway's only studio located outside the U.S. and was closed in July 2009 after the sale of most of Midway's assets to Warner Bros. A game called Necessary Force was being developed at the time of the closure. The rights to the game have diverted back to Midway Games as they are shopping the intellectual property. Some members of the team were able to band together and form a new company, Atomhawk Design.

In July 2010, Robert Troughton, founder of Pitbull Syndicate, announced the formation of Pitbull Studio, one year after Midway folded the renamed company. Troughton also said that an unannounced project was in development.

Games developed

As Pitbull Syndicate

As Midway Studios – Newcastle

Unauthorized logo used by hate groups 
In the early 2000s, Pitbull Syndicate's logo was used by several Neo-Nazi groups, most prominently by the Keystone United skinhead group. The Anti-Defamation League has listed this exact pitbull image as a White Supremacist extremist symbol.

References

External links 
Company page
Pitbull show off k9, Automaniacs and Over the Top
Pitbull Studio page
Atom Hawk page

Midway Games
Video game development companies
Video game companies established in 1996
Video game companies disestablished in 2009
Defunct video game companies of the United Kingdom
Defunct companies based in Tyne and Wear